Argenis Casimiro Núñez (born December 30, 1981) is a Dominican amateur boxer best known for winning two medals at the Pan Am Games.

Career
In 2003 at the Pan Am Games he beat Washington Silva but lost to Cuban southpaw Yoan Pablo Hernández in the light-heavyweight category and won bronze.

In 2005 at the PanAm Championships (not the Pan Am Games) he lost to Yusiel Napoles.

He managed to lose weight and drop down to middleweight afterwards.
At the Central American Games in 2006 he lost in the first round to eventual winner Yordanis Despaigne.
At the Pan Am Games 2007 he won silver at middleweight, losing to Emilio Correa.

At the World Championships 2007 he KOD Elshod Rasulov and beat two other fighters but did not win a medal because he lost to Ukrainian Sergiy Derevyanchenko. However, he qualified for the 2008 Olympics, where he lost to Alfonso Blanco.

External links
PanAm 2003 results
PanAm 2007 results
World Championships 2007
sports-reference

Living people
1981 births
Middleweight boxers
Boxers at the 2003 Pan American Games
Boxers at the 2007 Pan American Games
Boxers at the 2008 Summer Olympics
Olympic boxers of the Dominican Republic
Dominican Republic male boxers
Pan American Games silver medalists for the Dominican Republic
Pan American Games bronze medalists for the Dominican Republic
Pan American Games medalists in boxing
Medalists at the 2003 Pan American Games
Medalists at the 2007 Pan American Games